Dario Baldan Bembo (born 15 May 1948) is an Italian composer, singer-songwriter, music arranger and musician, best known for the songs "Aria" and "Amico è".

Background 
Born in Milan, Baldan Bembo started his music career as a keyboardist for, among others, Lucio Battisti and Adriano Celentano.

In 1970 he joined the group Equipe 84, with whom he started working as a composer. In 1972 he got his first successes as author of two songs written for Mia Martini, "Piccolo uomo" and "Donna sola", followed in 1973 by "Minuetto" and in 1974 by "Inno". In 1975 he made his debut as a singer with the song  "Aria", which ranked second in the Italian hit parade and became an international success.

In 1981 he entered the competition at the Sanremo Music Festival with the song "Tu cosa fai stasera", which ranked third; the song was later covered by Guys 'n' Dolls  as "Broken Dreams" and by Sarah Brightman under the title "Just Show Me How to Love You". He came back in Sanremo in 1985, with the song "Da quando non ci sei".

His main hit as a songwriter was the song "Amico è", ending theme song of the Mike Bongiorno's quiz show SuperFlash, which later became a widely spread football chant.

As a composer his collaborations include Daniel Sentacruz Ensemble, Mina and Ornella Vanoni. Céline Dion covered his songs "Dolce fiore" (released as a single with the title "L'amour viendra") and "L'amico è" (with the title "Hymne à l'amitié").

Discography

Singles
 1975 - Aria 
 1975 - Crescendo 
 1977 - Non mi lasciare 
 1978 - Piccolina 
 1979 - Giuro 
 1981 - Tu cosa fai stasera? 
 1983 - Amico è (with Caterina Caselli)
 1983 - Voci di città 
 1984 - Flashback (as "Space Philharmonic")
 1985 - Da quando non ci sei (una volta ancora)

Studio albums

 1975 - Aria  
     1975 - Crescendo 
     1977 - Migrazione  
     1979 - Dario Baldan Bembo  
     1981 - Voglia d'azzurro  
     1982 - Etereo (as "Bembo's Orchestra")
     1982 - Spirito della Terra 
     1985 - Spazi uniti
     1991 - Un po' per vivere, un po' per sognare
     1996 - Il canto dell'umanità 
     1999 - Amico è - I successi

References

External links
 

 

1948 births
Singers from Milan
Italian singer-songwriters
Italian pop singers
Italian pop musicians
Living people
Italian composers
Italian male composers
Italian music arrangers
Italian keyboardists
Italian multi-instrumentalists